Johann Erich Thunmann or Johannes or Hans (23 August 1746 — 17 December 1778) was a linguist, historian and theologian born in Thoresund (Södermanland) in Sweden. He studied at Strängnäs and Uppsala then left Sweden to study at Greifswald. Thunmann was professor of philosophy at the University of Halle.

"Eastern Europeans" 

Thunmann made extensive study of the peoples of Eastern Europe.
He was the first author to use the term "Eastern Europeans" in a book title, in his Untersuchungen über die Geschichte der östlichen europäischen Völker, 1774. Thunmann's work served as a liberal agenda for nations without nation states. Thunmann was one of the scientists who did not believe that Bulgarians are Slavs, or at least not "pure Slavs". He believed that Vlachs are descendants of old Thracian and Dacian tribes or Getic people. In 1825, based also on Thunmann's works, Mikhail Pogodin wrote his thesis "On the origins of the Rus'" which supports the Normanist theory of Russian origins.

Albanians 

Thunmann was one of the most important early authors writing about the language and origin of Albanians. The first serious attempts to present scientific explanation of the origin of Albanians began with Thunmann. He believed that the history and language of Albanians, besides Aromanians, were the least known European people in the West.

Thunmann was the first scholar to disseminate the theory about the autochthonous Albanians and to present the Illyrian theory of the origin of Albanians. Thunmann researched the origin of the term "Skipatar", the term Albanians use as their ethnic name. In 1774 Thunmann republished a three-language (Albanian, Greek and Aromanian) lexicon Theodor Kavalioti first published in 1770, and later added a Latin translation. Thunmann believed in Illyro-Thracian unity.

Bibliography 
Thunmann's notable works include:

 
 
 
 
  - reprint

References

External links 
 Über die Geschichte und Sprache der Albaner und der Wlachen (On the History and Language of the Albanians and Vlachs), Leipzig 1774, English translation published on the website of Robert Elsie

1746 births
1778 deaths
Philosophy academics
18th-century Swedish historians
Linguists from Sweden
Swedish theologians
University of Halle alumni
Albanologists
Aromanian studies
18th-century Protestant theologians